Starting from the mid-1990s, an increasing number of movies have been shot digitally. Some of them are independent, low-budget productions, while others are major studio productions. Since the mid-2010s, most movies across the world are captured and distributed digitally.

Notable firsts 

 First major studio film shot primarily on digital video: Star Wars: Episode II – Attack of the Clones (2002)
 First film shot digitally in Official Competition at Cannes Film Festival: Russian Ark (2002)
 First nominees for the Academy Award for Best Cinematography shot mainly on digital video: The Curious Case of Benjamin Button and Slumdog Millionaire (2009)
 First winner of the Academy Award for Best Cinematography shot mainly on digital video: Slumdog Millionaire (2009))
 First winner of the Academy Award for Best Cinematography shot entirely on digital video: Avatar (2010)
 First film shot with the Red One Camera: Che (2008)
 First film shot with the Red One MX, and first film projected in 4K theatrical distribution: The Social Network (2010)
 First film to be shot mainly with the Arri Alexa: Anonymous (2011)
 First film to be shot mainly with the Red Epic Dragon and in 6K resolution: Gone Girl (2014)
 First film shot mainly with the Arri Alexa 65: The Revenant (2015)
 First film shot mainly with digital IMAX cameras: Avengers: Infinity War (2018) and Avengers: Endgame (2019)
 First film shot mainly with the Red Weapon Vista Vision and in 8K resolution: Guardians of the Galaxy Vol. 2 (2017)

List of films 
The movies listed are shot mainly digitally. Digital formats overtook film by 2013, while over 80% of major films released in 2014 were shot digitally. The list includes films shot before 2015.

{| class="wikitable sortable" style="width:100%;"
!Title
!Cinematographer
!Camera type
!width=140|Lens type
!width=35|Year
!Notes
|-
|Baahubali 
|K. K. Senthil Kumar
|Arri Alexa XT
|
|2015
|
|-
|Term Life
|Roberto Schaefer
|Arri Alexa
|Cooke S4
|2014
|recorded in Apple ProRes 4444
|-
|Miles Ahead
|Roberto Schaefer
|Arri AlexaCanon EOS C500
|Zeiss Standard Primes
|2014
|30% shot on Super 16mm with Arri 416, 10% shot on Canon EOS C500
|-
|To B or Not to B
|Vierendrra Lalit
|Red One MX
|Red Pro Primes
|2014–15
|-
|Geostorm
|Roberto Schaefer
|Red Epic Dragon
|Cooke 5i Primes
|2014–15
|6K
|-
|You Again
|Andy Fickman
|Panavision Genesis HD Camera
|Panavision Primo 
|2010
|
|-
|The Hunger Games: Mockingjay – Part 1 and Part 2
|Jo Willems
|Arri Alexa XT
|Panavision anamorphic
|2014–15
|The first two films in the Hunger Games series were shot on 35mm and 65mm horizontal (IMAX).
|-
|It Follows
|Mike Gioulakis
|Arri Alexa XT
|Angenieux Optimo Lense
|2014
|
|-
|The Hobbit: The Battle of the Five Armies
|Andrew Lesnie
|Red Epic
|Zeiss Ultra Prime
|2014
|
|-
|Birdman
|Emmanuel Lubezki
|Arri Alexa M, Arri Alexa XT
|Leica Summilux-CZeiss Master Prime
|2014
|Winner of the 2014 Academy Award for Best Cinematography
|-
|Gone Girl
|Jeff Cronenweth
|Red Epic Dragon
|
|2014
|First feature film announced to be shot with the Red Dragon, sensor. As with Cronenweth's previous collaborations with Fincher, it made history as the first feature film to have a 6K workflow.
|-
|Guardians of the Galaxy
|Ben Davis
|Arri Alexa XT Plus
|Panavision PrimoCooke Xtal ExpressAngenieux Optimo
|2014
|
|-
|Dawn of the Planet of the Apes
|Michael Seresin
|Arri Alexa M
|Leica SummiluxFujinon Premier
|2014
|
|-
|Transformers: Age of Extinction
|Amir Mokri
|IMAX 3D digital camera, Red Epic Dragon
|
|2014
|The first mainstream feature-length film to be partially shot with the IMAX 3D digital camera.
|-
|The Fault in Our Stars
|Ben Richardson
|Arri Alexa XT
|Zeiss Master Prime
|2014
|
|-
|X-Men: Days of Future Past
|Newton Thomas Sigel
|Arri Alexa M, Arri Alexa XT
|Leica SummiluxFujinon Premier
|2014
|Some scenes shot with Phantom v642 Broadcast, Aaton XTR Prod and Bolex Camera.
|-
|Godzilla
|Seamus McGarvey
|Arri Alexa Plus 4:3
|Panavision Primo, C-Series,PVintage, ATZ, AWZ2 and Cooke
|2014
|
|-
|Captain America: The Winter Soldier
|Trent Opaloch
|Arri Alexa Plus 4:3, Red Epic
|Panavision C-, E-, G-Series,ATZ and AWZ2 Lenses
|2014
|
|-
|Left Turn
|Geno Salvatori
|Sony Cinealta F65
|
|2014
|
|-
|Rebel City Rumble
|Anthony Bowes
|Sony Cinealta F65
|
|2014
|
|-
|Left Turn
|Geno Salvatori
|Sony Cinealta F65
|
|2014
|
|-
|The Hunters Club Movie
|Kit McDee
|Red Epic MX
|Lomo Anamorphic
|2014
|Shot in Australia in 2012 with a budget of less than $100,000
|-
|Iron Man 3
|John Toll
|Arri Alexa Studio, Red Epic, Canon 1DC
|
|2013
|
|-
|Jobs
|Russell Carpenter
|Arri Alexa
|
|2013
|
|-
|The Underground Railroad
|Joshua Michael Stern
|Arri Alexa
|
|2013
|Shot in 2012
|-
|Upstream Color
|Shane Carruth
|Panasonic GH2
|
|2013
|Shot in 2012
|-
|The Umbrella Man
|Joe Grasso
|Red Epic MX
|
|2013
|Shot in 2012
|-
|The Wind is Watching
|Greg Kraus
|Red Epic MX
|
|2013
|Shot in 2012
|-
|Texas Chainsaw 3D
|Anastas N. Michos
|Red Epic MX
|
|2013
|
|-
|Monsoon
|Sturla Gunnarsson
|
|
|2013
|
|-
|Parker
|J. Michael Muro
|Red Epic MX
|
|2013
|
|-
|Stand Up Guys
|Michael Grady
|Red Epic MX
|
|2013
|
|-
|After Earth
|Peter Suschitzky
|Sony Cinealta F65, Canon EOS C500
|
|2013
|
|-
|Oblivion
|Claudio Miranda
|Sony Cinealta F65
|
|2013
|
|-
|Motel
|Steve Mason
|Sony Cinealta F65
|
|2013
|
|-
|The Smurfs 2
|Phil Meheux
|Sony Cinealta F65
|
|2013
|
|-
|Evil Dead
|Aaron Morton
|Sony Cinealta F65
|
|2013
|
|-
|No Good Deed
|Michael Barrett
|Sony Cinealta F65
|
|2013
|
|-
|About Last Night
|Michael Barrett
|Sony Cinealta F65
|
|2013
|
|-
|The Hobbit: The Desolation of Smaug
|Andrew Lesnie
|Red Epic MX
|
|2013
|
|-
|Gravity
|Emmanuel Lubezki
|Arri Alexa
|
|2013
||Winner of the 2013 Academy Award for Best Cinematography
|-
|Pacific Rim
|Guillermo Navarro
|Red Epic MX
|
|2013
|
|-
|R.I.P.D.
|Alwin Küchler
|Arri Alexa
|
|2013
|
|-
|World War Z
|Robert Richardson
|Arri Alexa
|
|2013
|
|-
|42
|Don Burgess
|Red Epic MX
|
|2013
|
|-
|Cleveland, I Love You
|Zach Christy
|Canon EOS 7D, Canon EOS 5D Mark II
|
|2013
|
|-
|Oz: The Great and Powerful
|Peter Deming
|Red Epic MX
|
|2013
|
|-
|Elysium
|Trent Opaloch
|Red Epic MX
|
|2013
|
|-
|47 Ronin
|John Mathieson
|Arri Alexa
|
|2013
|
|-
|The Host
|Roberto Schaefer
|Arri Alexa
|Zeiss Master Prime
|2013
|
|-
|Hitchcock
|Jeff Cronenweth
|Red Epic MX
|
|2012
|
|-
|LUV
|Gavin Kelly
|Red One MX
|
|2012
|
|-
|Unconditional
|Michael Regalbuto
|Red Epic MX
|
|2012
|
|-
|Aashiq Patthey
|Robby Singh
|Red Epic MX
|
|2012
|
|-
|The Victim
|Julius Dmello
|Canon EOS 7D
|Canon Lenses
|2012
|First Konkani Digital Theatrical film in Konkani Cinema by Milroy Goes
|-
|Rust and Bone
|Stéphane Fontaine
|Red Epic MX
|Cooke S4
|2012
|
|-
|Bachelorette
|Doug Emmett
|Red One MX
|
|2012
|
|-
|That's My Boy
|Brandon Trost
|Red Epic MX
|
|2012
|
|-
|Bad Ass
|John Barr
|Red One MX
|
|2012
|
|-
|The Man with the Iron Fists
|Chi Ying Chan
|Red One MX
|
|2012
|
|-
|Get the Gringo
|Benoît Debie
|Red One MX
|
|2012
|
|-
|Maximum Conviction
|Nathan Wilson
|Red One MX
|
|2012
|
|-
|Searching for Venice
|Wonjung Bae
|Canon C300
|
|2012
|
|-
|Hard Boiled Sweets
| Sara Deane
|Canon EOS 5D Mark II
|
|2012
|
|-
|Kon-Tiki (2012 film)
|Geir Hartly Andreassen
|Arri Alexa Plus, Sony NEX-FS100 and Red One MX
|
|2012
|
|-
|Deus Ex Machina
|Giuseppe BadalamentiSebastián Rivera
|Red One M, Canon EOS 5D Mark III
|
|2012
|
|-
|Partav
|Mohammad Younis Zargar
|Canon EOS 5D Mark II
|Zeiss 50mm 1.4
|2012
||Winner of the 2013 Award of Excellence CANADA INT Film Festival
|-
|The Great Gatsby
|Simon Duggan
|Red Epic MX
|
|2013
|
|-
|Friends With Kids
|Will Rexer
|Arri Alexa
|
|2012
|
|-
|Pitch Perfect
|Julio Macat
|Arri Alexa
|
|2012
|
|-
|Sams I'm Glück
|Gerhard Schirlo
|Arri Alexa
|
|2012
|
|-
|Shut Up and Play the Hits
|Reed Morano
|Arri Alexa
|
|2012
|
|-
|Sparkle
|Anastas Michos
|Arri Alexa
|
|2012
|
|-
|The Hunt
|Charlotte Bruus Christensen
|Arri Alexa
|
|2012
|
|-
|The Hypnotist
|Mattias Montero
|Arri Alexa
|
|2012
|
|-
|The Pact
|Bridger Nielson
|Arri Alexa
|
|2012
|
|-
|The Watch
|Barry Peterson
|Arri Alexa
|
|2012
|
|-
|The Wedding
|Jonathon Brown
|Arri Alexa
|
|2012
|
|-
|Russian Disco
|Tetsuo Nagata
|Arri Alexa
|
|2012
|
|-
|Robot and Frank
|Matthew J. Loyd
|Arri Alexa
|
|2012
|
|-
|Goats
|Wyatt Troll
|Arri Alexa
|
|2012
|
|-
|Lay The Favorite
|Michael McDough
|Sony CineAlta F35
|
|2012
|
|-
|Lawless
|Benoit Delhomme
|Arri Alexa
|
|2012
|
|-
|Hello I Must Be Going
|Julie Kirkwood
|Arri Alexa
|
|2012
|
|-
|Life of Pi
|Claudio Miranda
|Arri Alexa
|
|2012
|Winner of the 2012 Academy Award for Best Cinematography
|-
|Flight
|Don Burgess
|Red Epic MX
|Zeiss Master Prime
|2012
|
|-
|The Hobbit: An Unexpected Journey
|Andrew Lesnie
|Red Epic MX
|Zeiss Ultra Prime
|2012
|The first feature film to be shot and presented in high frame rate format
|-
|Skyfall
|Roger Deakins
|Arri Alexa
|Zeiss Master Prime
|2012
|The first and currently only James Bond film to be shot digitally
|-
|Gangster Squad
|Dion Beebe
|Arri Alexa
|
|2012
|Phantom Flex Camera used for high-speed photography
|-
|Here Comes the Boom
|Phil Méheux
|Arri Alexa
|
|2012
|
|-
|Dredd
|Anthony Dod Mantle
|Red One MX
|
|2012
|
|-
|Gambit
|Florian Ballhaus
|Arri Alexa
|
|2012
|
|-
|2 Days in New York
|Lubomir Bakchev
|Arri Alexa
|
|2012
|
|-
|Amour
|Darius Khondji
|Arri Alexa
|
|2012
|
|-
|Bernie
|Dick Pope
|Arri Alexa
|
|2012
|
|-
|Broken City
|Ben Seresin
|Arri Alexa
|
|2012
|
|-
|Celeste and Jesse Forever
|David Lanzanberg
|Arri Alexa
|Zeiss Ultra Prime
|2012
|
|-
|Cosmopolis
|Peter Suschitzky
|Arri Alexa
|
|2012
|
|-
|Chronicle
|Matthew Jensen
|Arri Alexa
|
|2012
|
|-
|Big Sur
|M. David Mullen
|Red Epic MX
|
|2012
|
|-
|Styria
|Grzegorz Bartoszewicz
|Arri Alexa
|
|2012
|
|-
|Resident Evil: Retribution
|Glen MacPherson
|Red Epic MX
|
|2012
|
|-
|Mental
|Donald McAlpine
|Red Epic MX
|
|2012
|
|-
|Seeking a Friend for the End of the World
|Tim Orr
|Arri Alexa
|
|2012
|
|-
|Total Recall
|Paul Cameron
|Red Epic MX
|Panavision C, E, G series anamorphic
|2012
|
|-
|Ruby Sparks
|Matthew Libatique
|Arri Alexa
|
|2012
|
|-
|Ted
|Michael Barrett
|Panavision Genesis
|Panavision Primo
|2012
|
|-
|Magic Mike
|Steven Soderbergh
|Red Epic MX
|Hawk anamorphic
|2012
|
|-
|The Amazing Spider-Man
|John Schwartzman
|Red Epic MX
|Panavision Primo
|2012
|
|-
|Abraham Lincoln: Vampire Hunter
|Caleb Deschanel
|Arri Alexa
|
|2012
|
|-
|Rock of Ages
|Bojan Bazelli
|Arri Alexa
|Cooke S4
|2012
|
|-
|Think Like a Man
|Larry Blanford
|Red Epic MX
|
|2012
|
|-
|The Dictator
|Lawrence Sher
|Arri Alexa
|
|2012
|
|-
|The Guillotines
|Andrew Lau
|Arri Alexa
|
|2012
|
|-
|The Five-Year Engagement
|Javier Aguirresarobe
|Arri Alexa
|
|2012
|
|-
|Billa II
|R. D. Rajasekhar
|Red Epic MX
|
|2013
|
|-
|Jack the Giant Killer
|Newton Thomas Sigel
|Red Epic MX
|
|2012
|
|-
|Prometheus
|Dariusz Wolski
|Red Epic MX
|
|2012
|Sir Ridley Scott's first digital feature
|-
|What to Expect When You're Expecting
|Xavier Pérez Grobet
|Arri Alexa
|
|2012
|
|-
|The Avengers
|Seamus McGarvey
|Arri Alexa, Canon EOS 5D Mark II, Canon EOS 7D
|
|2012
|
|-
|Zero Dark Thirty
|Greig Fraser
|Arri Alexa
|Cooke S4
|2012
|
|-
|Hansel and Gretel: Witch Hunters
|Michael Bonvillain
|Arri Alexa
|
|2012
|
|-
|Act of Valor
|Shane Hurlbut
|Canon EOS 5D Mark II
|
|2012
|
|-
|Gone
|Michael Grady
|Red Epic MX
|
|2012
|
|-
|Ghost Rider: Spirit of Vengeance
|Brandon Trost
|Red One MX
|
|2012
|
|-
|Underworld: Awakening
|Scott Kevan
|Red Epic MX
|
|2012
|
|-
|A Few Best Men
|Stephen F. Windon
|Arri Alexa
|
|2012
|
|-

|Dehorokkhi
|Iftekhar Chowdhury
|Red One MX
|
|2012
|
|-
|Haywire
|Steven Soderbergh
|Red One MX
|Hawk anamorphic
|2012
|
|-
|Wrong
|Quentin Dupieux
|HD-Koi (prototype)
|
|2012
|
|-
|Setup
|Mike Gunther
|Red One
|
|2011
|
|-
|Catch .44
|Aaron Harvey
|Red One MX
|Hawk V-LiteV-Plus Lenses
|2011
|
|-
|Albert Nobbs
|Michael McDonough
|Red One MX
|
|2011
|
|-
|Extremely Loud and Incredibly Close
|Chris Menges
|Arri Alexa
|
|2011
|
|-
|11-11-11
|Joseph White
|Arri Alexa
|
|2011
|
|-
|The Wholly Family
|Nicola Pecorini
|Arri Alexa
|
|2011
|
|-
|Once Upon a Time in Anatolia
|Gökhan Tiryaki
|Sony CineAlta F35
|
|2011
|
|-
|Wild Bill
|George Richmond
|Arri Alexa
|
|2011
|
|-
|This Is 40
|Phedon Papamichael
|Arri Alexa
|
|2011
|
|-
|The Girl With the Dragon Tattoo
|Jeff Cronenweth
|Red One MX, Red Epic MX
|Zeiss Master Prime
|2011
|Red Epic was used to shoot scenes in both the US and Sweden. The film was also the first to employ a workflow higher than 4K resolution from production to presentation.
|-
|The Darkest Hour
|Scott Kevan
|Sony CineAlta F35
|
|2011
|
|-
|Final Destination 5
|Brian Pearson
|Arri Alexa
|
|2011
|
|-
|Young Adult
|Eric Steelberg
|Arri Alexa
|
|2011
|
|-
|The Muppets
|Don Burgess
|Red One MX, Red Epic MX
|Zeiss Ultra Prime
|2011
|
|-
|Hugo
|Robert Richardson
|Arri Alexa
|
|2011
|Winner of the 2011 Academy Award for Best Cinematography
|-
|Immortals
|Brendan Galvin
|Panavision Genesis
|
|2011
|
|-
|Jack and Jill
|Dean Cundey
|Arri Alexa
|Cooke S4
|2011
|
|-
|A Very Harold & Kumar 3D Christmas
|Michael Barrett
|Panavision Genesis
|
|2011
|
|-
|The Three Musketeers
|Glen MacPherson
|Arri Alexa
|
|2011
|
|-
|Vicky and the Treasure of the Gods
|Christian Rein
|Arri Alexa
|
|2011
|
|-
|Rampart
|Bobby Bukowski
|Arri Alexa
|
|2011
|
|-
|Killer Joe
|Caleb Deschanel
|Arri Alexa
|
|2011
|
|-
|Headshot
|Chankit Chamnivikaipong
|Red One MX
|
|2011
|
|-
|Dolphin Tale
|Karl Walter Lindenlaub
|Red One MX
|
|2011
|
|-
|Our Idiot Brother
|Yaron Orbach
|Red One MX
|
|2011
|
|-
|Anonymous
|Anna Foerster
|Arri Alexa
|
|2012
|The first feature-length film to be shot with Alexa
|-
|Spy Kids: All the Time in the World
|Robert RodriguezJimmy Lindsey
|Arri Alexa
|
|2012
|
|-
|Contagion
|Steven Soderbergh
|Red One MX
|Red Pro Prime
|2011
|
|-
|Margin Call
|Frank DeMarco
|Red One MX
|
|2011
|
|-
|The Inbetweeners Movie
|Ben Wheeler
|Arri Alexa
|
|2011
|
|-
|The Devil's Double
|Sam McCurdy
|Red One MX
|
|2011
|
|-
|Drive
|Newton Thomas Sigel
|Arri Alexa
|
|2011
|
|-
|In Time
|Roger Deakins
|Arri Alexa
|
|2011
|
|-
|Captain America: The First Avenger
|Shelly Johnson
|Panavision Genesis
|
|2011
|Underwater sequences and epilogue shot with Arri Alexa
|-
|Zookeeper
|Michael Barrett
|Panavision Genesis
|
|2011
|
|-
|Horrible Bosses
|David Hennings
|Panavision Genesis
|
|2011
|
|-
|Bucky Larson: Born to Be a Star
|Michael Barrett
|Panavision Genesis
|
|2011
|
|-
|Bellflower
|Joel Hodge
|Custom based on Silicon Imaging SI-2K
|
|2011
|
|-
|Melancholia
|Manuel Alberto Claro
|Arri Alexa
|
|2011
||Phantom HD Camera used for high-speed photography
|-
|Mr. Popper's Penguins
|Florian Ballhaus
|Arri Alexa
|
|2011
|
|-
|Transformers: Dark of the Moon
|Amir Mokri
|Sony CineAlta F35
|
|2011
|Most non-action scenes/close-ups shot with 35mm film
|-
|Return of the Moonwalker
|Mike Maria
|Red Epic MX
|
|2011
|
|-
|Pina
|Hélène LouvartJörg Widmer
|Sony HDC-1500
|
|2011
|
|-
|Pirates of the Caribbean: On Stranger Tides
|Dariusz Wolski
|Red One MX
|
|2011
|
|-
|Prom
|Byron Shah
|Arri Alexa
|
|2011
|
|-
|TT3D: Closer to the Edge
|Thomas Kürzl
|Red One MX
|
|2011
|
|-
|The Lincoln Lawyer
|Lukas Ettlin
|Red One MX
|
|2011
|
|-
|Shark Night 3D
|Gary Capo
|Fusion Camera System, Sony CineAlta F35
|
|2011
|
|-
|Sanctum
|Jules O'Loughlin
|Fusion Camera System
|
|2011
|
|-
|Drive Angry
|Brian Pearson
|Red One MX, Silicon Imaging SI-2K
|
|2011
|
|-
|Cedar Rapids
|Chuy Chávez
|Arriflex D-21
|
|2011
|
|-
|Like Crazy
|John Guleserian
|Canon EOS 7D
|
|2011
|
|-
|The Future (film)
|Nikolai von Graevenitz
|Red One M
|
|2011
|
|-
|Sick Boy
|Sean C. Cunningham
|Canon EOS 7D
|
|2011
|Canon EOS L-Series lenses, StickyPod, Redrock Micro "Captain Stubling" rig and Lensbaby Muse
|-
|Tron: Legacy
|Claudio Miranda
|Sony CineAlta F35
|
|2010
|Phantom HD Camera used for high-speed photography
|-
|Blue Valentine
|Andrij Parekh
|Red One M
|Cooke S4
|2010
|Present-day scenes shot on Red, flashback scenes shot on 16mm
|-
|Red State
|David Klein
|Red One MX, Canon EOS 7D
|
|2010
|Canon 7D used only for 'running with camera' shots
|-
|Winter's Bone
|Michael McDonough
|Red One M
|Zeiss Master Prime
|2010
|
|-
|Sarah's Key
|Pascal Ridao
|Red One M
|Cooke S4
|2010
|
|-
|Jackass 3D
|Dimitry Elyashkevich
|Red One M
|
|2010
|
|-
|Hubble 3D
|James Neihouse
|IMAX Cargo Bay 3-D Camera
|
|2010
|
|-
|The Devil's Rock
|Paul Campion
|Red One M
|
|2010
|
|-
|Fair Game
|Doug Liman
|Red One M
|
|2010
|
|-
|Resident Evil: Afterlife
|Glen MacPherson
|Fusion Camera System
|
|2010
|
|-
|The Social Network
|Jeff Cronenweth
|Red One MX
|Zeiss Master Prime
|2010
|First film to feature a 2K pipeline, from production to presentation.
|-
|127 Hours
|Anthony Dod MantleEnrique Chediak
|Canon EOS 5D Mark II, Canon EOS 7D, Silicon Imaging SI-2K
|
|2010
|
|-
|Machete
|Jimmy Lindsey
|Panavision Genesis
|
|2010
|
|-
|Certified Copy
|Luca Bigazzi
|Red One M
|
|2010
|
|-
|Casino Jack
|Adam Swica
|Red One M
|
|2010
|
|-
|Date Night
|Dean Semler
|Panavision Genesis
|
|2010
|
|-
|The Chronicles of Narnia: The Voyage of the Dawn Treader
|Dante Spinotti
|Sony CineAlta F23
|
|2010
|-
|Rosario
|Carlo Mendoza
|Arri Alexa
|
|2010
|First Filipino film to be shot with ARRI Alexa
|-
|Yogi Bear
|Peter James
|Fusion Camera System
|
|2010
|
|-
|Step Up 3D
|Ken Seng
|Fusion Camera System
|
|2010
|
|-
|Death at a Funeral
|Rogier Stoffers
|Panavision Genesis
|
|2010
|
|-
|Film Socialisme
|Fabrice AragnoPaul Grivas
|Sony PMW-EX1, Sony HDR-TG1E, JVC Everio, Canon EOS 5D Mark II, Samsung NV24HD, Archos 404 Camcorder
|
|2010
|
|-
|Killers
|Russell Carpenter
|Arriflex D-21
|
|2010
|
|-
|Grown Ups
|Theo van de Sande
|Panavision Genesis
|
|2010
|
|-
|Rabbit Hole
|Frank G. DeMarco
|Red One M
|
|2010
|
|-
|Rubber
|Quentin Dupieux
|Canon EOS 5D Mark II
|
|2010
|
|-
|twelve
|Steven Fierberg
|Red One M
|
|2010
|
|-
|Avatar
|Mauro Fiore
|Fusion Camera System
|Fujinon 6.3-101mm T2 and 7-35mm T1.8
|2009
|First 100% digitally photographed film to win the Academy Award for Best Cinematography
|-
|The Informant!
|Steven Soderbergh
|Red One M
|Red Pro prime
|2009
|
|-
|Youth in Revolt
|Chuy Chávez
|Sony CineAlta F35
|
|2009
|
|-
|The Box
|Steven Poster
|Panavision Genesis
|
|2009
|
|-
|Zombieland
|Michael Bonvillain
|Panavision Genesis
|
|2009
|
|-
|The Final Destination
|Glen MacPherson
|Fusion Camera System
|
|2009
|
|-
|District 9
|Trent Opaloch
|Red One M
|
|2009
|
|-
|The Secret in Their Eyes
|Félix Monti
|Red One M
|
|2009
|
|-
|Valhalla Rising
|Morten Søborg
|Red One M
|
|2009
|
|-
|Public Enemies
|Dante Spinotti
|Sony CineAlta F23
|
|2009
|Some car interiors during chases shot on Sony XDCAM EX-1
|-
|The Girlfriend Experience
|Steven Soderbergh
|Red One M
|Panavision C-series anamorphic
|2009
|
|-
|Gamer
|Ekkehart Pollack
|Red One M
|
|2009
|
|-
|Antichrist
|Anthony Dod Mantle
|Red One M
|
|2009
|Phantom HD Camera used for high-speed photography
|-
|Samantha Darko
|Chris Fisher
|Red One M
|
|2009
|
|-
|Surviving Evil
|Mike Downie
|Thomson Viper
|
|2009
|
|-
|Tetro
|Mihai Mălaimare Jr.
|Sony CineAlta F900
|
|2009
|
|-
|Crank: High Voltage
|Brandon Trost
|Canon XH-A1
|
|2009
|Fifteen Canon HF10 were used as Crash-Cams
|-
|The Book of Eli
|Don Burgess
|Red One M
|Panavision Primo
|2009
|
|-
|Knowing
|Simon Duggan
|Red One M
|
|2009
|
|-
|Achchamundu! Achchamundu!
|Arthur Wilson
|Red One M
|
|2009
|
|-
|Like You Know It All
|Kim Hoon-kwang
|Sony PMW-EX1
|
|2009
|
|-
|My Bloody Valentine 3D
|Brian Pearson
|Red One M, Silicon Imaging SI-2K
|
|2009
|
|-
|Leaves of Grass
|Roberto Schaefer
|Red One M
|
|2009
|
|-
|neighbor
|Marc Jeff Schirmer
|Red One M
|
|2009
|
|-
|The Spirit
|Bill Pope
|Panavision Genesis
|
|2008
|Phantom HD Camera used for high-speed photography
|-
|The Curious Case of Benjamin Button
|Claudio Miranda
|Thomson Viper
|Zeiss DigiPrime
|2008
|
|-
|Slumdog Millionaire
|Anthony Dod Mantle
|Silicon Imaging SI-2K
|
|2008
|First digitally photographed film to win the Academy Award for Best Cinematography.  Shot on multiple formats, including 35mm and digital stills.
|-
|Rachel Getting Married
|Declan Quinn
|Sony CineAlta F23
|
|2008
|
|-
|You Don't Mess With The Zohan
|Michael Barrett
|Panavision Genesis
|
|2008
|
|-
|Chemical Wedding
|Brian Herlihy
|Thomson Viper
|
|2008
|
|-
|Che: Part Two
|Steven Soderbergh
|Red One M
|Red Pro prime
|2008
|
|-
|Che: Part One
|Steven Soderbergh
|Red One M
|Red Pro prime
|2008
|Che was the first feature-length film to use Red One cameras
|-
|Get Smart
|Dean Semler
|Panavision Genesis
|
|2008
|
|-
|Speed Racer
|David Tattersall
|Sony CineAlta F23
|
|2008
|
|-
|Three Monkeys
|Gökhan Tiryaki
|Sony CineAlta F900
|
|2008
|
|-
|Deception
|Dante Spinotti
|Panavision Genesis
|
|2008
|
|-
|21
|Russell Carpenter
|Panavision Genesis
|
|2008
|
|-
|Journey to the Center of the Earth
|Chuck Shuman
|Fusion Camera System
|
|2008
|
|-
|Cloverfield
|Michael Bonvillain
|Sony CineAlta F23
|
|2008
|Segments, other shots include the Panasonic HVX-200, as well as the Thomson Viper
|-
|RocknRolla
|David Higgs
|Arriflex D-21
|
|2008
|
|-
|The Bank Job
|Michael Coulter
|Arriflex D-21
|
|2008
|
|-
|Before the Devil Knows You're Dead
|Ron Fortunato
|Panavision Genesis
|
|2007
|
|-
|Reign Over Me
|Russ Alsobrook
|Panavision Genesis
|
|2007
|
|-
|Youth Without Youth
|Mihai Mălaimare Jr.
|Sony CineAlta F900
|
|2007
|
|-
|Zodiac
|Harris Savides
|Thomson Viper
|Zeiss DigiPrime
|2007
|
|-
|Balls of Fury
|Thomas E. Ackerman
|Panavision Genesis
|
|2007
|
|-
|Walk Hard: The Dewey Cox Story
|Uta Briesewitz	
|Panavision Genesis
|
|2007
|
|-
|Superbad
|Russ Alsobrook
|Panavision Genesis
|
|2007
|
|-
|I Now Pronounce You Chuck and Larry
|Dean Semler
|Panavision Genesis
|
|2007
|
|-
|Next
|David Tattersall
|Panavision Genesis
|
|2007
|
|-
|Chronicle of Purgatory: The Waiter
|Jason Konopisos
|Panasonic AG-DVX100 (Andromeda Modification)
|
|2007
|The Andromeda Modification bypasses the DV compression to get uncompressed 4:4:4 10-bit RGB data straight from the CCD block
|-
|Planet Terror
|Robert Rodriguez
|Panavision Genesis
|
|2007
|
|-
|Apocalypto
|Dean Semler
|Panavision Genesis
|
|2006
|
|-
|Once
|Tim Fleming
|Sony HVR-Z1
|
|2006
|
|-
|Inland Empire
|David Lynch
|Sony DSR-PD150
|
|2006
|
|-
|Miami Vice
|Dion Beebe
|Thomson Viper
|
|2006
|
|-
|Superman Returns
|Newton Thomas Sigel
|Panavision Genesis
|
|2006
|
|-
|Click
|Dean Semler
|Panavision Genesis
|
|2006
|
|-
|Climates
|Gökhan Tiryaki
|Sony CineAlta F900
|
|2006
|
|-
|Colossal Youth
|Pedro CostaLeonardo Simões
|Panasonic AG-DVX100
|
|2006
|
|-
|Crank
|Adam Biddle
|Sony CineAlta F950
|
|2006
|Some scenes shot with Canon XL-2
|-
|Flyboys
|Henry Braham	
|Panavision Genesis
|
|2006
|
|-
|Them (Ils)
|David MoreauXavier Palud
|Panasonic AG-DVX100
|
|2006
|
|-
|Still Life
|Zhangke Jia
|Sony HVR-Z1
|
|2006
|
|-
|Me and You and Everyone We Know
|Chuy Chávez
|Sony CineAlta F900
|
|2005
|
|-
|Il vento fa il suo giro
|Roberto Cimatti
|Panasonic AG-DVX100
|
|2005
|
|-
|Star Wars: Episode III – Revenge of the Sith
|David Tattersall
|Sony CineAlta F950
|
|2005
|
|-
|The Adventures of Shark Boy & Lava Girl
|Robert Rodriguez
|Sony CineAlta F950
|
|2005
|
|-
|Bubble
|Steven Soderbergh
|Sony CineAlta F900/F950
|
|2005
|
|-
|Manderlay
|Anthony Dod Mantle
|Sony CineAlta F900
|
|2005
|Some scenes shot with Sony DSR-PD100
|-
|Sin City
|Robert Rodriguez
|Sony CineAlta F950
|
|2005
|
|-
|Sky Captain and the World of Tomorrow
|Eric Adkins
|Sony CineAlta F900
|
|2005
|
|-
|Collateral
|Paul CameronDion Beebe
|Sony CineAlta F900, Thomson Viper
|
|2004
|35mm used for some scenes
|-
|Land of Plenty
|Franz Lustig
|Panasonic AG-DVX100
|
|2004
|
|-
|The World
|Yu Lik-wai
||Sony CineAlta F900
|
|2004
|
|-
|Dogville
|Anthony Dod Mantle
|Sony CineAlta F900
|
|2003
|Some scenes shot with Sony DSR-PD100
|-
|Spy Kids 3-D: Game Over
|Robert Rodriguez
|Sony CineAlta F900
|
|2003
|
|-
|Once Upon A Time In Mexico
|Robert Rodriguez
|Sony CineAlta F900
|
|2003
|Was filmed in 2001 but released theatrically in 2003
|-
|Pieces of April
|Tami Reiker
|Sony DSR-PD150
|
|2003
|Filmed in 2002 and released in 2003
|-
|Virgin
|Benjamin Wolf
|Sony DSR-PD150
|
|2003
|Shot in 2002 and released in 2003
|-
|Unknown Pleasures
|Yu Lik-wai
|Sony DSR-PD150
|
|2002
|Other scenes shot in Digital Betacam
|-
|Spy Kids 2: Island of Lost Dreams
|Robert Rodriguez
|Sony CineAlta F900
|
|2002
|
|-
|Russian Ark
|Tilman Büttner
|Sony CineAlta F900
|Canon ENG
|2002
|
|-
|Star Wars: Episode II – Attack of the Clones
|David Tattersall
|Sony CineAlta F900
|
|2002
|
|-
|9 Songs
|Marcel Zyskind
|Panasonic AG-DVX100
|
|2002
|Other scenes shot with Sony DSR-PD150
|-
|Full Frontal
|Steven Soderbergh
|Canon XL-1s
|
|2002
|
|-
|Personal Velocity: Three Portraits
|Ellen Kuras
|Sony DSR-PD150
|
|2002
|
|-
|Tadpole
|Hubert Taczanowski
|Sony DSR-PD150
|
|2002
|Shot with three digital cameras
|-
|24 Hour Party People
|Robby Muller
|Sony DSR-PD150
|
|2002
|
|-
|28 Days Later...
|Anthony Dod Mantle
|Canon XL-1s
|
|2002
|Some shots in 35mm
|-
|Xuxa e os Duendes
|Cezar Moraes
|Sony CineAlta F900
|
|2001
|
|-
|All About Lily Chou-Chou
|Noboru Shinoda
|Sony CineAlta F900
|
|2001
|
|-
|The Anniversary Party
|John Bailey
|Sony DSR-500
|
|2001
|
|-
|By Hook or By Crook
|Ann T. Rossetti
|Sony vx2000
|
|2001
|
|-
|The King Is Alive
|Jens Schlosser
|Sony DSR-PD150
|
|2001
|
|-
|The Center of the World
|The Chau Ngo
|Arri Alexa
|
|2001
|Used Digital Betacam for some scenes and the Sony DRV-100 for others 
|-
|The Wager
|Arnar Thor Thorisson
|Sony CineAlta F900
|
|2001
|Shot in 2001, released in 2004
|-
|Vidocq (2001 film)
|Jean-Pierre SauvaireJean-Claude Thibaut
|Sony HDW-F900 CineAlta
|
|2001
|
|-
|You Got Nothin'''
|Cliff HsuiJonathan Zames
|Sony HDW-F900 CineAlta
|
|2001
|Shot in 2001, released in 2002.
|-
|Xtracurricular|J.P. Lipa
|Sony HDW-F900 CineAlta
|
|2001
|Some scenes shot on Panasonic AJ-HDC27 Varicam and Sony DSR-500WS.  Shot in 2001, released in 2003
|-
|Tortilla Soup|Xavier Pérez Grobet
|Panasonic AJ-HDC27 Varicam
|
|2001
|Home video release from 35mm Interpostive
|-
|Bamboozled|Ellen Kuras
|Sony DCR-VX1000
|
|2000
|Some scenes shot in 16mm
|-
|Chuck & Buck|Chuy Chávez
|Sony DCR-VX1000
|
|2000
|
|-
|Dancer in the Dark|Robby Müller
|Sony DXC-D30WS
|
|2000
|Musical numbers shot with 100 Sony DSR-PD100s
|-
|Our Lady of the Assassins|Barbet Schroeder
|Sony HDW-700
|
|2000
|Premiered September 1, 2000 (Telluride Film Festival)
|-
|Ivans Xtc|Bernard Rose
|Sony HDW-700A
|
|2000
|Premiered September 12, 2000 (Toronto International Film Festival)
|-
|Everything Put Together|Roberto Schaefer
|Sony DCR-VX1000
|
|2000
|Shot entirely on HD in the summer of 1999, premiered in 2000
|-
|Solid Ones|Matthew W. David
|Sony HDW-700A
|
|1999 
|Shot entirely on HD in the summer of 1999, premiered in 2000
|-
|God Wears My Underwear|Adam Streit
|Canon XL-1
|Canon EOS zoom
|1999 
|Shot in 1999, released in 2005
|-
|The Book of Life|Jim Denault
|Sony DCR-VX1000
|
|1998
|
|-
|The Celebration|Anthony Dod Mantle
|Sony DCR-PC3
|
|1998
|
|-
|The Idiots|Lars von Trier
|Sony DCR-VX1000
|
|1997
|
|-
|Hope|Pete Anderson
|Canon GL1
|
|1997
|
|-
|Windhorse
|Steve Schecter
|Sony DVW-700WS 
Sony DCR-VX1000 
|
|1996
|Premiered 1998 at the Santa Barbara Film Festival
|-
|The Demons in My Head 
|Grant Hoy
|Sony DVW-700WS 
|
|1996
|Premiered 15 June 1997 at the Sanctuary Cove Village Theater, Queensland, Australia. Also first feature film to be online edited in a computer and projected digitally
|}

 See also 
 List of large sensor interchangeable-lens video cameras
 List of motion picture topics
 Filmizing
 Russian Ark - The first feature film shot completely in uncompressed high-definition

 References 

 External links 
 American Cinematographer article about Star Wars: Episode II
 American Cinematographer article about Collateral
 DigitalCinemaNow article about "HD 2K 4K Digital hi-end cameras"
 HD Magazine "All about HD in all its guises - capture to distribution"
 Official Panavision Media Center & Reference Library
 Light Illusion'' Various Tech Papers about Digital Cinematography and Digital Film
 Official Sony Professional Website

Film and video technology
Digital movie cameras
Cinematography